The 1994 Tasmanian International featured a doubles competition which was consented by 16 teams including a team that qualified from the qualifying match earlier in that week. In the final of the first double competition, American pair, Linda Harvey-Wild and Chanda Rubin defeated Australian pair Jenny Byrne and Rachel McQuillan 7–5, 4–6, 7–6(7–1) to record their third and second career doubles title respectively.

Seeds
Champion seeds are indicated in bold text while text in italics indicates the round in which those seeds were eliminated.

 Inés Gorrochategui /  Larisa Neiland (semifinals)
 Debbie Graham /  Ann Grossman (first round)
 Laura Golarsa /  Patricia Tarabini (quarterfinals)
 Linda Harvey-Wild /  Chanda Rubin (champions)

Draw

External links
 1994 Tasmanian International Doubles Draw
 Main draw (WTA)

Doubles
Hobart International – Doubles